The Suzhou North railway station is a high-speed railway station in Suzhou, Jiangsu, People's Republic of China. It will be served by the Beijing–Shanghai High-Speed Railway. It is 10.5 kilometers away from Suzhou railway station.

See also
Suzhou railway station

References

Railway stations in Jiangsu
Railway stations in Suzhou
Railway stations in China opened in 2010
Xiangcheng District, Suzhou